Boompa Records is a Canadian independent record label, founded in 2003 and based in Vancouver, British Columbia, Canada.

History 
Boompa Records (launched in September 2003) was established as a music production company by Rob Calder and Scott  L.D. Walker, fellow members of the Canadian Indie Band The Salteens. The label's creation was marked with the release of The Salteens' album Let Go of Your Bad Days in the Spring of 2003.

Beginning in Summer 2003, Boompa began their expansion into publicity services, music placement and licensing and artist management. As the label progressed, they further expanded to manage grant administration, tour management, promotions, booking and web services. Boompa has also organized grant administration for non-Boompa artists, including Hot Hot Heat, Destroyer (band), and Humans (Canadian band).

Boompa received positive acclaim in its first year, where it was credited with releasing "consistently excellent" music. The company was described by Canadian music critic Adrien Begrand as "the most fun [label] to discover" in 2004.

Since the label's formation, songs by Boompa artists have been featured on such shows as Grey's Anatomy, Joan of Arcadia, Dawson's Creek, Degrassi, The L-Word, Alienated, Radio Free Roscoe and Yo Gabba Gabba!  among others.

Boompa bands and artists have also been featured at many festivals and music events, including POP Montreal, Canadian Music Week, SXSW, Halifax POP Explosion and Rifflanida. Internationally, Boompa artists have also made performances in Reykjavík at the Iceland Airwaves Festival.

Currently, they are distributed by Outside (CAN), Nail (USA), Lirico (JAP), The Orchard (Digital World). To date, Boompa has released 59 catalogues of music.

Label Roster (Current Artists) 
The Belle Game · Woodpigeon · Christopher Smith

Label Roster (Catalogue Artists) 
The Salteens · Small Sins · The Rentals · Reverie Sound Revue · Colleen and Paul · Circlesquare · Patrick Brealey · Leeroy Stagger ·  Lullaby Baxter · The Hylozoists ·  Run Chico Run · my project: blue · Matt Sharp (weezer, The Rentals) · Sekiden · The Lucksmiths.

Discography

See also
 List of record labels

References

External links
Boompa Records official site www.boompa.ca

Record labels established in 2003
Canadian independent record labels
Indie rock record labels
Indie pop record labels
Alternative rock record labels
2003 establishments in British Columbia